St. Cloud station is an Amtrak intercity train station in St. Cloud, Minnesota, United States. It is served by the daily Empire Builder on its route connecting Chicago, Illinois to Seattle, Washington and Portland, Oregon. The next stop westbound is  while the next stop eastbound is Saint Paul Union Depot.

Description
The station is located at 555 East Saint Germain Street on the east side of the Mississippi River in the middle of a wye that links to the St. Cloud Rail Bridge. The depot is easily accessible from US 10 by taking the SH 23 interchange (toward St. Cloud) and heading southwest on 3rd Street Southeast (SH 23), then north-northwest on Lincoln Avenue Southeast, then southeast on East Saint Germain Street, and finally north-northwest again on the station access road (immediately after crossing the tracks). There is an enclosed waiting room (with restrooms) available daily from 4:00 am to 6:00 am and from 11:30 pm to 1:15 am (early the next morning), with a caretaker opening and closing the depot. It has neither ticketing office, ticket counter, nor a Quik-Trak kiosk. No other services are provided at the station (i.e., baggage, lounge, pay phone, etc.). The tracks, platform, depot building, and parking lot are all owned by the BNSF Railway.

History
It was built in 1909 by the Northern Pacific Railway. The depot is constructed of brown pressed brick with grey granite trim.

The St. Cloud station was served by the North Coast Hiawatha, with service from Chicago to Seattle from 1971 until the train was discontinued in 1979. The next westbound stop for the North Coast Hiawatha was in Staples and the next eastbound stop was in Minneapolis, Minnesota. When the North Coast Hiawatha was discontinued in 1979, the Empire Builder was rerouted away from Willmar, Minnesota to St. Cloud and has served the station continuously since then. The next westbound stop for the Empire Builder is also in Staples and the next eastbound stop is in Saint Paul. However, in 2014, Amtrak service in Saint Paul was moved from the Midway Station to the Saint Paul Union Depot.

Future service
The Northstar commuter rail service was originally planned to originate in Rice, Minnesota and serve the St. Cloud station, but was cut back to Big Lake. On November 8, 2010, it was announced that extension of the line to St. Cloud had been indefinitely delayed, as projected ridership is not sufficient to qualify for federal funding.

Notes

References

External links

St. Cloud Amtrak Station (USA Rail Guide -- Train Web)

1898 establishments in Minnesota
Amtrak stations in Minnesota
Buildings and structures in St. Cloud, Minnesota
Former Northern Pacific Railway stations
Railway stations in the United States opened in 1898
Transportation in Stearns County, Minnesota